The 1998 Monterey Sports Car Championships was the final race for the 1998 IMSA GT Championship season and the final race for the IMSA GT Championship before the series would be reorganized into the American Le Mans Series. It took place on October 25, 1998, at Mazda Raceway Laguna Seca. This event was a shared event with the FIA GT Championship (report here).

Official results
Class winners in bold.

Statistics
 Pole Position - #4 Panoz Motorsports - 1:17.754
 Average Speed - 164.62 km/h

External links
 Race results
 Photo Gallery

Petit Le Mans
Monterey Sports Car Championships
Monterey